is a railway station located in an industrial area of the city of Mishima, Shizuoka Prefecture, Japan operated by the private railroad company Izuhakone Railway. The rail yard for the Izuhakone Railway is located at this station.

Lines
Daiba Station is served by the Sunzu Line, and is located 5.5 kilometers from the starting point of the line at Mishima Station.

Station layout
The station has an island platform and a side platform serving three tracks, connected by a  level crossing. Platforms 1 and 2 are used for both normal and express traffic. Platform 3 is used primarily during commuting hours, and the track at Platform 3 terminates at Daiba Station. The station building is staffed.

Platforms

History 
Daiba Station was opened on May 20, 1898, as part of the initial construction phase of the Sunzu Line. The station building was rebuilt in 2005.

Passenger statistics
In fiscal 2017, the station was used by an average of 2488 passengers daily (boarding passengers only).

Surrounding area
Mishima Minami High School
Mishima Nakago Junior High School

See also
 List of Railway Stations in Japan

References

External links

 Official home page

Railway stations in Japan opened in 1898
Railway stations in Shizuoka Prefecture
Izuhakone Sunzu Line
Mishima, Shizuoka